The Broken Place is a novel by American author Michael Shaara. It was published by the New American Library in 1968.

Plot
The plot concerns a Korean War veteran who comes home from the war depressed. With deep psychological wounds, he only feels alive in the world of boxing.

External links
Criticism at Alibris

1968 American novels
Novels by Michael Shaara
American sports novels
Novels about boxing
1968 debut novels
New American Library books